Luigi Rados (19 October 1773 – 1840) was an Italian engraver.

Life
Rados was born in Parma and educated at the  city's academy.

He collaborated extensively with the French painter Jean-François Bosio, who worked  under the name Giovanni Battista Bosio while in Milan under the French occupation. Rados' plates after Bosio include a portrait of the French viceroy  Eugène de Beauharnais (1807)  and illustrations for  an updated Milanese equivalent  of   Carracci's  Cries of Bologna, published under the title of I costumi di Milano e suoi circondari.  Rados also engraved many of the portraits drawn by Bosio for the second volume of  the Serie di vite e ritratti de'famosi personaggi degli ultimi tempi,  a three-volume collection  of illustrated biographies  published in Milan between 1815 and 1818.

References

Sources

 

1773 births
1840 deaths
Italian engravers
Artists from Parma